Franklin Lubbock "Char" Miller IV (born November 23, 1951) is an American historian and environmental analysis scholar. He is the W.M. Keck Professor of Environmental Analysis and History at Pomona College and the director of the Claremont Colleges' environmental analysis program.

Early life and education
Miller was born on November 23, 1951. He attended the Pomfret School and then Pitzer College, graduating in 1975, and subsequently received his Master's degree and doctorate from Johns Hopkins University.

Career
Miller began his teaching career at the University of Miami in 1980. He moved to Trinity University in 1981, where he ultimately served as chair of the History Department and Director of Urban Studies. After nearly 30 years as a professor at Trinity, Miller began teaching at Pomona College in 2007. He is a Senior Fellow at the Pinchot Institution for Conservation and a Fellow of the Forest History Society.

Works

 West Side Rising: How San Antonio's 1921 Flood Devastated a City and Sparked a Latino Environmental Justice Movement (2021)
 Hetch Hetchy: A History in Documents (2020)
 San Antonio: A Tricentennial History (2018)
 Ogallala: Water for a Dry Land (2018)
 Not So Golden State: Sustainability vs. the California Dream (2016)
 America's Great National Forests, Wildernesses, and Grasslands (2016)
 Seeking the Greatest Good: The Conservation Legacy of Gifford Pinchot (2013)
 Death Valley National Park: A History (2013)
 On the Edge: Water, Immigration, and Politics in the Southwest (2013)
 Public Lands, Public Debates: A Century of Controversy (2012)

References

External links
Pomona College faculty page
Biographical interview on the Pomona College Sagecast

Pitzer College alumni
Johns Hopkins University alumni
Pomona College faculty
Living people
1951 births
American environmentalists
Environmental scientists
Historians from California